The Berbice slave uprising was a slave revolt in Guyana that began on 23 February 1763 and lasted to December, with leaders including Coffy. The first major slave revolt in South America, it is seen as a major event in Guyana's anti-colonial struggles, and when Guyana became a republic in 1970 the state declared 23 February as a day to commemorate the start of the Berbice slave revolt.

Background
The colony of Berbice was originally a hereditary fief of the Van Peere family. After refusing to pay the ransom demanded by the French privateer Jacques Cassard, the colony changed hands to four Amsterdam merchants who founded the Society of Berbice as a public company listed on the Amsterdam Stock Exchange. The colony was not very successful compared to other colonies, because it only paid 4% dividend to the stockholders.

In 1762, the population of the Dutch colony of Berbice included 3,833 enslaved Blacks, 244 enslaved Amerindians or indigenous people, and 346 whites. The Seven Years' War caused a reduction in supplies to the colony, resulting in hunger among the slave population. In late 1762, a disease had broken out in the fort, and many soldiers had died or fallen ill. On 3 July 1762, Laurens Kunckler, the owner of plantation Goed Fortuin, left for Fort Nassau. The slaves used this opportunity to raid the plantation, and hide on an island high upriver. Indigenous soldiers (especially "Carib" and Arawak) were crucial to the Dutch effort to retake Berbice, as their scouting and harassing of rebel troops in the interior prevented the formation of Maroon communities similar to those in Suriname. The soldiers, despite aid by indigenous allies, were unable to recapture the island until the rebels were forced to leave on 8 or 9 August, likely due to lack of food.

Revolution
On 23 February 1763, slaves on plantation Magdalenenberg on the Canje River in Berbice rebelled, protesting harsh and inhumane treatment. They torched the plantation house, and made for the Courantyne River where Caribs and troops commanded by Governor  of Suriname attacked, and killed them. On 27 February 1763, a revolt took place on plantation Hollandia on the Berbice River next to Lilienburg, where Coffy was an enslaved man working as a cooper. He is said to have organized them into a military unit. From then on, the revolt spread to neighbouring plantations.

There were supposed to be 60 soldiers in Fort Nassau; however, at the time of uprising, there were only 18 men including civilian militia in the fort. As plantation after plantation fell to the slaves, the Dutch settlers fled northward and the rebels began to take over control of the region. For almost a year, the rebels held on to southern Berbice, while the whites were able to hold on to the north. Eventually only about half of the white population that had lived in the colony remained.

The rebels came to number about 3,000 and threatened European control over the Guianas. Coffy was installed as the political leader, and Accara was the military leader. Coffy tried to keep the captured plantations operating to prevent starvation. Governor van Hoogenheim asked the States General for military assistance. On 28 March 1763, the ship Betsy arrived from Suriname with 100 soldiers. The former slaves were driven back, and a camp was set up at De Dageraad ("The Daybreak"). On 2 April, 300 to 400 rebels attacked, led by Accara, which drove them back.

Suppression
Coffy contacted van Hoogenheim and said that he regretted the attack, and started peace negotiations suggesting to split Berbice into a European and an African part. The Governor replied that Amsterdam should make the decision, and that it could take three to four months. In April, 200 troops arrived from Barbados, because a message was sent to Gedney Clarke, who owned seven plantations in the Dutch colonies as well, and in May, Sint Eustatius provided military assistance. In the meantime, word had reached Amsterdam. On 21 May 1763, the Amsterdamsche Courant reported the revolt of the slaves. The merchants demanded action, and six ships with a total of 600 men set sail to Berbice. Field Marshal von Brunswick-Wolfenbüttel was assigned to devise a plan to reconquer the colony.

On 19 October 1763, it was reported to the governor that Captain Atta had revolted against Coffy, and that Coffy had committed suicide. This cancelled the peace negotiations; however, the colonists had already been strengthened by the arrival of soldiers. 

On 1 January 1764, the six ships arrived, providing the starting signal for expeditions against the rebel slaves. The insurgents were being defeated. Captain Atta and Accara were captured, at which time Accara changed sides, and helped the Dutch to capture Captain Accabre, the last of the insurgents, on 15 April 1764. The Dutch executed many rebels for participating in the rebellion. The estimates vary from 75 to 128 (125 men and 3 women). leading to the colony’s recapture by the summer of 1764 and savage repercussions. Around 1,800 rebels died, with 24 burned alive Captain Accara was pardoned, and later served as a freedman with the marines under his former adversary Fourgeoud. The population of the colony had decreased to 1,308 male slaves, 1,317 females, 745 children, and 115 whites in November 1764, which includes recently purchased slaves.

Aftermath
Very little changed after the Berbice slave uprising. The Society of Berbice did complain about the number of executions after the uprising, however, they were worried about their reputation and the loss of valuable slaves. The Dutch newspapers devoted a lot of coverage to the uprising, they quickly lost interest after the revolt was put down. The last publication was on the subject was on 19 September 1764 by the Leeuwarder Courant, which published a sensationalist eyewitness account of the executions.

During the fighting, Fort Nassau had been abandoned and set on fire to prevent it falling into enemy hands. In 1785, it was decided to move the government to Fort Sint Andries, which was renamed as New Amsterdam in 1791. The Society of Berbice was in serious financial problems after the revolt, and asked the States of Holland (provincial government) for a loan. In 1773, the Society of Berbice had repaid ƒ134,815 of the ƒ786,354, and asked for a deferral of payment, which was granted. There are no records that the remaining amount or interest have ever been paid. In February 1765, Gedney Clarke's son send an invoice of ƒ41,060 for his assistance, which was never paid.

A couple of years later in Suriname, escaped slaves led by Boni attacked plantations. Boni tried to get a peace treaty similar to what the Ndyuka and Saramaka received in 1760 and 1762 respectively, but a war was declared instead. The reason why the Society of Suriname changed their position is unknown; however, people auch as Lichtveld pointed to the Berbice slave uprising. In the mid-1770s military officers who had handled the Berbice uprising were dispatched to Suriname.

Legacy

Kofi is commemorated on 23 February as the national hero of Guyana. In 1976, a bronze monument was erected in the Square of the Revolutions, in the capital Georgetown. The monument has been designated as a National Monument.

See also
 Cheddi Jagan Bio Diversity Park
 Demerara rebellion of 1823
 Boni Wars
 History of Guyana
 Slave rebellion

References

Further reading

.

1763 in the Dutch Empire
1764 in the Dutch Empire
1763 in South America
1764 in South America
Conflicts in 1763
Conflicts in 1764
18th-century rebellions
Afro-Guyanese
Berbice
History of Guyana
Slave rebellions in South America
Slavery in Guyana
Wars involving Guyana
Wars involving the Dutch Republic
Military history of the Dutch Empire